Setaria leucopila, commonly known as streambed bristlegrass or plains bristlegrass, is a perennial prairie grass that is native to the southern plains of the United States.

Description
Although good forage for livestock, it is only fair for wildlife use. It reproduces by seeds and tillers.

References

External links

leucopila
Native grasses of Oklahoma